The Wych Elm cultivar Ulmus glabra 'Minor' was described by Loudon in Arboretum et Fruticetum Britannicum 3: 1398, 1838.

Description
Loudon described the tree as having "more branching and spreading habit, of lower growth, with more twiggy shoots and these more densely clothed with leaves".

Cultivation
No specimens are known to survive.

References

Wych elm cultivar
Ulmus articles missing images
Ulmus
Missing elm cultivars